Joseph James Maraziti (June 15, 1912 – May 20, 1991) was a one-term U.S. Representative from New Jersey from 1973 to 1975.

Early life and career
Maraziti was born in Boonton, New Jersey and attended the public schools.
He attended Fordham University School of Law and received his law degree from the New Jersey Law School in 1937.

He served in the Citizens Military Training Corps and as an Infantry and Judge Advocate, beginning in 1931.

He was admitted to the New Jersey bar in 1938 and commenced a legal practice in Boonton.

Political career
He served as a legislative secretary for the New Jersey Senate from 1931 to 1934, and again from 1938 to 1940.
He was legislative secretary to New Jersey assembly from 1936 to 1937.
Boonton Municipal Court Judge from 1940 to 1947.
He was an assistant prosecutor, Morris County from 1950 to 1953.
He served as a member of the New Jersey General Assembly from 1958 to 1967, and in the New Jersey Senate from 1968 to 1972.
Majority whip, 1972.
He served as a delegate to New Jersey State Republican convention, 1966.
He was an alternate delegate to Republican National Convention, 1968.

Congress
Maraziti was elected as a Republican to the Ninety-third Congress (January 3, 1973 – January 3, 1975).
In 1974, Maraziti was one of the 38 House Judiciary Committee members who considered articles of impeachment against Richard Nixon during the Watergate scandal, consistently voting with the one-third Republican bloc against impeachment.
He was an unsuccessful candidate for reelection in 1974 to the Ninety-fourth Congress.
He resumed the practice of law.
He was a resident of Boonton, New Jersey, until his death there on May 20, 1991.

References

1912 births
1991 deaths
People from Boonton, New Jersey
Politicians from Morris County, New Jersey
Republican Party members of the New Jersey General Assembly
New Jersey lawyers
Republican Party New Jersey state senators
Military personnel from New Jersey
Republican Party members of the United States House of Representatives from New Jersey
20th-century American lawyers
20th-century American politicians
American people of Italian descent